Anoista insolita is a moth of the  family Yponomeutidae. It is found in Australia, including Tasmania.

External links
Australian Faunal Directory

Yponomeutidae
Moths described in 1939